Konchem Touchlo Unte Chepta (KTUC) is an Indian Telugu-language Television Talk show hosted by Pradeep Machiraju. The first episode of the first season of the show was aired on 27 September 2014.

Regular segments

Heads Up 
In this game, celebrities act out a word shown to them on a tab. Pradeep has to then guess the word and vice versa.

Super Six 
In this round, celebrities give quick answers about other co-stars they have acted with.

Season 1 
Season 1 began airing on 27 September 2014.

Season 2 
Season 2 began airing on 8 November 2015.

Season Super Sundays 
Season Super Sundays began airing on 10 July 2016.

Season 3 
Season 3 started airing from 1 April 2017.

Season 4
The first episode aired live from set with host thanking people and revealing what's in store for audience on 13 July 2019.

References 

 http://www.zeetelugu.com/shows/konchem-touch-lo-unte-chepta/video
 http://timesofindia.indiatimes.com/tv/news/telugu/Kajal-Aggarwal-to-appear-on-Pradeeps-talk-show/articleshow/43247335.cms
 http://timesofindia.indiatimes.com/tv/news/telugu/Pradeep-excited-about-Bham-Bholenath/articleshow/45415907.cms
 http://timesofindia.indiatimes.com/tv/news/telugu/Sharwanand-changed-eight-schools/articleshow/46164286.cms
 http://timesofindia.indiatimes.com/tv/news/telugu/Pradeep-talks-about-his-first-job/articleshow/45597291.cms

Indian television talk shows
Telugu-language television shows
Zee Telugu original programming